The Serie B 1999–2000 was the sixty-eighth tournament of this competition played in Italy since its creation.

Teams
Alzano, Fermana, Pistoiese and Savoia had been promoted from Serie C, while Salernitana, Sampdoria, Vicenza and Empoli had been relegated from Serie A.

Final classification

Results

Relegation tie-breaker

A.C. Cesena relegated to Serie C1 2000-01.

Serie B seasons
2
Italy